Cyriel Vanoverberghe (4 May 1912 – 28 January 1995) was a Belgian racing cyclist. He rode in the 1936 Tour de France.

References

1912 births
1995 deaths
Belgian male cyclists
Place of birth missing